Arthur Seabrook (12 October 1895–1981) was an English footballer who played in the Football League for Crewe Alexandra, Halifax Town, Northampton Town and Stockport County.

References

1895 births
1981 deaths
English footballers
Association football forwards
English Football League players
Northampton Town F.C. players
Halifax Town A.F.C. players
Crewe Alexandra F.C. players
Stockport County F.C. players